Percy Ernest Stirton (17 August 1867 – 27 January 1937) was an Australian politician.

Biography
He was born in Paterson to Presbyterian minister Thomas Stirton and Jean Ray Bell Nivison. He was educated at Sydney Grammar School and in 1884 was articled as a clerk to an Inverell solicitor. He was admitted as a solicitor in 1890, practising in a partnership at Moree. He was also a Moree alderman, serving as mayor in 1886. In 1903 he was elected in a by-election to the New South Wales Legislative Assembly as the Liberal member for Moree, but he was defeated running for Gwydir the following year. He later became a grazier, and was involved in the formation of the Country Party. Stirton died at Darlinghurst in 1937.

References

 

1867 births
1937 deaths
Members of the New South Wales Legislative Assembly